Marigolds in Flower is a 1998 Russian drama film directed by Sergey Snezhkin.

Plot 
The film tells about the "new Russians" who want to buy a cottage and find themselves in the house of a dead writer, whose family members meet the main characters in different ways.

Cast 
 Era Ziganshina as Seraphima
 Marina Solopchenko as Anna (as Marina Salopchenko)
 Kseniya Rappoport as Yelena
 Yuliya Sharikova as Masha
 Lyubov Malinovskaya as Inessa Iosifovna
 German Orlov as Billi Bons
 Sergey Dreyden as Nikolai (as Sergey Dontsov)
 Nikolay Lavrov as Rusetsky
 Aleksandr Tyutryumov as Dzhigurda
 Ivan Krasko

References

External links 
 

1998 films
1990s Russian-language films
Russian drama films
1998 drama films